Albert Bourlon (23 November 1916 – 16 October 2013) was a French professional road bicycle racer. He was born in Sancergues. In 1947, Bourlon won the 14th stage of the Tour de France.

Major results

1947
Paris–Bourges
Tour de France:
Winner stage 14

References

External links 

Official Tour de France results for Albert Bourlon

1916 births
2013 deaths
French male cyclists
French Tour de France stage winners
Sportspeople from Cher (department)
Cyclists from Centre-Val de Loire